Adamson Institute of Business Administration and Technology is a private university located in Karachi, Pakistan. From 1 October 2005, the Institute has been an affiliate of the University of Karachi, which accredits its degree programmes.

Degree programs
 Bachelor of Business Administration 	  	
 Master of Business Administration
 Bachelor of Computer Science

References

External links
 Adamson Institute of Business Administration and Technology

Universities and colleges in Karachi
University of Karachi